The women's 4 × 400 metres relay event at the 2006 Commonwealth Games was held on March 25.

Results

References
Results

Relay
2006
2006 in women's athletics